Paola Locatelli, known by the pseudonym Paola Lct, born on March 2, 2004, in Thionville, is a French influencer, model, actress, and entrepreneur of Cape Verdean and Italian origin.

She became known in 2015 then aged 11 years, by publishing videos on the platform YouTube.

Early life 
Paola Locatelli was born in Thionville, Moselle. She moved to Paris when she was 2, and has been living there ever since. She has a brother named Gabriel and a sister named Mélissa.

Career 
At 12, Paola launches her own collection, Star Styles in collaboration with online fashion boutique Lesara.

In 2019, she is recognized by Rihanna in Seoul during an event of the brand Fenty Beauty.

As part of the #VeetParlonsPoils advertising campaign, Veet calls on Paola in 2019.

On October 28, 2020, during the COVID-19 pandemic, she is received at the Élysée Palace by Gabriel Attal with other influencers to spread a health message to young people.

At the end of 2020, she collaborates with Just Dance for Just Dance 2021.

On May 8, 2021, Paola unveils her pair of sunglasses in collaboration with Kapten & Son.

In October 2021, Paola creates her perfume in collaboration with Louis Vuitton, on the Louis Vuitton grounds in Grasse.

Paola is one of the talents of the agency . This agency deals with administration, contracts and negotiations with brands.

Paola is a brand ambassador for Puma.

Filmography

Film 
 2022 : Les Liaisons dangereuses (Dangerous Liaisons): Célène, on Netflix.
 2022: Chair tendre: Anna, on France TV Slash.

Activism and philanthropy 
Paola is godmother of the association named Aïda, which helps young people affected by cancer.

References

External links 
 
 

2004 births
Living people
French people of Cape Verdean descent
French people of Italian descent
21st-century French women
21st-century French actresses
People from Thionville
Social media influencers